Saint Isaac may refer to:

People 
 Isaac, son of Abraham in the Old Testament
 Saint Isaac of Dalmatia (4th-century–383)
 Saint Isaac of Monteluco, also called St. Isaac of Spoleto (died c. 550)
 Saint Isaac Jogues (1607–1646)
 Saint Isaac of Dafra
 Saint Isaac of Armenia (338–439)
 Saint Isaac of Nineveh (died c. 700)

Buildings, structures, and places 
Saint Isaac's Cathedral, in Saint Petersburg, Russia
Saint Isaac's Square, in Saint Petersburg, Russia
Saint Isaac's Bridge, the first bridge across Neva river in St.Petersburg, Russia